Sharklet, manufactured by Sharklet Technologies, is a bio-inspired plastic sheet product structured to impede microorganism growth, particularly bacterial growth. It is marketed for use in hospitals and other places with a relatively high potential for bacteria to spread and cause infections. Coating surfaces with Sharklet work due to the nano-scale texture of the product's surface.

The inspiration for Sharklet's texture came through analysis of the texture of shark skin, which does not attract barnacles or other biofouling, unlike ship hulls and other smooth surfaces. The texture was later found to also repel microbial activity.

History 

Sharklet material is bio-inspired and was developed by Dr. Anthony Brennan, materials science and engineering professor at University of Florida, while trying to improve antifouling technology for ships and submarines at Pearl Harbor.

Brennan realized that sharks do not experience fouling. He observed that shark's skin denticles are arranged at the micrometre scale in a distinct diamond repeating micro-pattern with millions of tiny ribs. The width-to-height ratio of shark denticle riblets corresponded to his mathematical model for the texture of a material that would discourage microorganisms from settling. The first test performed showed an 85% reduction in green algae settlement compared to smooth surfaces.

Texture 
Sharklet's texture is a combination of “ridge” and “ravine” at a micrometer scale.

Resistance to bacterial attachment 

Adherence prevention and translocation restriction have been demonstrated, and are believed to contribute significantly to restrict the risk of device-associated infections.

Sharklet's topography creates mechanical stress on settling bacteria, a phenomenon known as mechanotransduction. Nanoforce gradients caused by surface variations induces stress gradients within the lateral plane of the surface membrane of a settling microorganism during initial contact. This stress gradient disrupts normal cell functions, forcing the microorganism to provide energy to adjust its contact area on each topographical feature to equalize the stresses. This expenditure of energy is thermodynamically unfavorable for the settler, inducing it to search for a different surface to attach to. Sharklet is made, however, with the same material as other plastics.

The physical arrangement enhances the hydrophobicity of the device surface such that the bacteria attachment energy is insufficient for adherence and/or colonization.

Environmental surface contamination provides a potential reservoir for pathogens to persist and cause infection in susceptible patients. Microorganisms colonize biomedical implants by developing biofilms, structured communities of microbial cells embedded in an extracellular polymeric matrix that are adherent to the implant and/or the host tissues. Biofilms are an important threat to human health as they may harbor large numbers of pathogenic bacteria. Up to 80% of bacterial infections in humans involve microorganisms from biofilms, and biofilm formation on medical devices can lead to nosocomial infections and potentially higher mortality rate. Indwelling of medical devices is associated with high risk of infection, given the abundance of bacterial flora on human skin and the risk of contamination from other sources, The fact that many of the pathogens responsible for these infections are multi-drug-resistant, or even panresistant, has become particularly problematic, with few treatment options being available to Healthcare workers and the industry are seeking safe and effective means to prevent device-associated infections.

Sharklet micro-patterns can be incorporated onto the surfaces of a variety of medical devices during the manufacturing process. This micro-pattern is effective against bio-fouling and microbial attachment and is non-toxic. It therefore has potential to help infection control on medical devices such as per-cutaneous devices. Sharklet micro-patterns have been shown to control the bio-adhesion of a wide range of marine microorganisms, pathogenic bacteria and eukaryotic cells. They reduce S. aureus and S. epidermidis colonization after exposure to a simulated vascular environment by 70% or greater when compared to smooth controls. This micro-pattern similarly reduces platelet adhesion and fibrin sheath formation by approximately 80%. An in vitro study demonstrated that it reduced the colonization of S. aureus and P. aeruginosa bacterial pathogens effectively. Importantly, this infection control was achieved without the aid of antimicrobial agents.

See also 
 Antimicrobial polymer
 Bioinspiration
 Micropatterning
 Nanomaterial
 Shark skin

References

External links
Technologies Inspired by Sharks

Antimicrobials
Products introduced in 2004
Biomimetics